The Jameh Mosque of Khozan is a historical mosque in the Khomeyni Shahr County of the Isfahan Province. The original building of the mosque dated back to the Timurid era in the 15th century, but it's improbable that the current building to be older than the Safavid era. The mosque has four iwans. The southern iwan leads to the inner space of the dome. The inner space of the dome is decorated by muqarnas. The walls of the mosque are covered by stones and bricks. The arches of the northern and southern iwans are decorated with some paintings from the Safavid era., but the paintings of the eastern and western iwans seem to belong to the Qajar era. The shabestan of the mosque is behind the western iwan. There are 20 stone columns with the height of 2 m in the shabestan. The shabestan had been lit originally with the marble stones of the ceiling, but during the recent reparations, these marble stones have been removed.

See also
 Islam in Iran

References 

Mosques in Isfahan Province
16th-century mosques